Dumitru Diacov (born 10 February 1952) is a Moldovan politician, former President and Deputy Speaker of the Parliament of the Republic of Moldova, deputy in the Parliament of the Republic of Moldova in several consecutive terms since the year 2005 and formerly between 1994 and 2001. He was former chairman of the Democratic Party of Moldova (from 2000 to 2009). In 2009, he gives to Marian Lupu the function of party chairman.

Biography 
Dumitru Diacov was born on 10 February 1952 in Kargapolie, Kurgan Oblast (Russia), in a family of Bessarabian deportees. In 1969, he became a student at the Faculty of Letters, Journalism Department, of the Moldova State University from Chișinău. In 1974, Dumitru Diacov graduated from Belarusian State University and then worked for TeleRadio-Moldova. After 1984, he worked as correspondent in Chişinău for Komsomolskaya Pravda and then for Komsomol and CPSU in Moscow (1986-1989). Between 1989–1993, he worked for Information Telegraph Agency of Russia in Bucharest.

Dumitru Diacov was a Moldovan MP (1994–2001, 2005-May 2009, July 2009 – 2010) and the president of the Moldovan Parliament (23 April 1998 – 20 March 2001).

He was president of the Democratic Party of Moldova (1997-June 2009) and later has been the honorary president. In November 2022, when the Democratic Party was turned into the European Social Democratic Party, he opposed this change and he didn't join the new party. Due to this, he was removed from the position as honorary president.

External links
 Ex-Communist speaker elected leader of opposition party in Moldova

References

1952 births
Living people
People from Kurgan Oblast
Belarusian State University alumni
Moldovan communists
Presidents of the Moldovan Parliament
Moldovan journalists
Male journalists
Moldovan MPs 2014–2018
Democratic Party of Moldova MPs
Moldovan MPs 1994–1998
Moldovan MPs 1998–2001
Moldovan MPs 2005–2009
Moldovan MPs 2009–2010

Recipients of the Order of Honour (Moldova)